His House in Order was a 1928 British silent drama film directed by Randle Ayrton and starring Tallulah Bankhead, Ian Hunter and David Hawthorne. It was made at Teddington Studios and based on the 1906 Broadway play His House in Order by Sir Arthur Wing Pinero. In 1920, Paramount Pictures filmed the same play, His House in Order.

The story follows a wealthy man who worships his first wife until he discovers their son is illegitimate.

Cast 
Tallulah Bankhead as Nina 
Ian Hunter as Hilary Jesson
David Hawthorne as Filmer Jesson
Eric Maturin as Major Maurewarde
Mary Dibley as Geraldine
Wyndham Guise as Sir Daniel Ridgeley
Nancy Price as Lady Ridgeley
Claude Beerbohm as Pryce Ridgeley
Sheila Courteney as Annabel Jesson
Pat Courteney as Derek Jesson

Preservation status
Both this version and the 1920 version are believed to be lost films.

References

External links

 His House in Order at BFI Film & TV Database

1928 films
1928 drama films
British black-and-white films
British silent feature films
British drama films
Films shot at Teddington Studios
Lost British films
1928 lost films
Lost drama films
1920s English-language films
1920s British films
Silent drama films